Eric Gatoto (born 1 April 1984) is a Burundian former professional footballer who played as a forward.

He became top goalscorer of the 2008 Burundi Premier League.

References

1984 births
Living people
Burundian footballers
Association football forwards
Burundi international footballers
Vital'O F.C. players
Flambeau de l'Est FC players